Hydrium may refer to several things:

 Hydrogen, hydrium is a former name for hydrogen. 
 Hydrium, a fictitious element in Kenneth Oppel's Matt Cruse novels, Airborn, Skybreaker, and Starclimber

See also

 Protium (disambiguation)
 Hydride
 Hydronium
 Hydron (disambiguation)
 Hydroxonium